1st TFCA Awards 
January 13, 1998

Best Film: 
 The Sweet Hereafter 
The 1st Toronto Film Critics Association Awards, honoring the best in film for 1997, were held on 13 January 1998.

Winners
Best Actor: 
Ian Holm - The Sweet Hereafter 
Runner-Up: Jack Nicholson – As Good as It Gets

Best Actress: 
Helena Bonham Carter - The Wings of the Dove
Runner-Up: Sarah Polley – The Sweet Hereafter

Best Canadian Film: 
The Sweet Hereafter
Runners-Up: The Hanging Garden

Best Director:  
Atom Egoyan - The Sweet Hereafter
Runners-Up: Curtis Hanson – L.A. Confidential, Ang Lee – The Ice Storm, Paul Thomas Anderson – Boogie Nights and James Cameron – Titanic

Best Film: 
The Sweet Hereafter
Runner-Up: L.A. Confidential

Clyde Gilmour Award: 
Clyde Gilmour

References

1997
1997 film awards
1997 in Toronto
1997 in Canadian cinema